Dudley Peninsula (known as Presquila Gallissoniere and as the MacDonnell Peninsula from 1857 to 1986) is the peninsula forming the eastern end of Kangaroo Island in the Australian state of South Australia.  It was occupied by Aboriginal Australians as recently as 3,100 years BP but was found to be unoccupied by the first European explorers to visit it in the early 19th century.  It was first settled by Europeans as early as the 1830s.  As of 2011, it had a population of 595 people.

Extent
Dudley Peninsula is the eastern end of Kangaroo Island.  It is connected to the main body of the island via an isthmus which itself forms the southern side of Pelican Lagoon.  The peninsula is bounded to the west by Pelican Lagoon, American River and Eastern Cove all within Nepean Bay, to the north-east by Backstairs Passage from Kangaroo Head in the west to Cape Willoughby in the east and to the south by the body of water known in Australia as the Southern Ocean and by international authorities as the Great Australian Bight.

Naming
The first reported European name for the Dudley Peninsula is "Presquila Gallissoniere" which was given by the Baudin Expedition. In 1857, it was named the "MacDonnell Peninsula" by William Bloomfield Douglas after Richard Graves MacDonnell, the sixth governor of South Australia. On 20 March 1986, it was renamed as the "Dudley Peninsula" to be "in keeping with local usage."

History

Aboriginal use
The archaeological record indicates that Kangaroo Island was occupied by Aboriginal Australians as early as 16,110 years BP.  European explorers visiting in the early 19th century found no evidence of human occupation as evident by lack of smoke from fires which was common along the Australian coastline at the time, overgrown vegetation that had not been managed by "firestick farming" and animals such as seals and kangaroos "appeared unused to human presence".  Aboriginal sites have been identified by the South Australian Museum and others on the Dudley Peninsula.  As of 1999, radiocarbon dating of material recovered via archaeological excavation from a site called Pigs Waterhole on the peninsula suggest aboriginal presence in the eastern end of Kangaroo Island as recently as 3,100 years BP.

European discovery and settlement

Dudley Peninsula was first visited by European navigators in 1802 when the British navigator, Matthew Flinders, explored its north coast during March 1802.  After meeting Flinders at Encounter Bay in April 1802, the Baudin expedition visited the peninsula's north coast later in April 1802 and explored its south coast during January 1803.
Formal settlement commenced in 1836 with a fleet under the control of the South Australian Company arriving at what is now Kingscote further west on Kangaroo Island.  Some of the people who had been living on that part of Kangaroo Island prior to 1836 moved to the peninsula to avoid being within the jurisdiction of the South Australian Company and thereby making it "most prosperous part of the island and the scene of its first significant agricultural and pastoral development."
The full extent of Kangaroo Island was gazetted on 13 August 1874 as the cadastral division known as the County of Carnarvon simultaneously with the creation of another cadastral division, the Hundred of Dudley, which covers the full extent of what is now the Dudley Peninsula. In 1875, land in the Hundred of Dudley near the north coast of the peninsula was surveyed and given freehold title in response for the demand for agricultural land.
The town of Penneshaw was proclaimed on 12 January 1882.  On 7 June 1888, the local government area of the District Council of Dudley was established.  This was subsequently merged in 1996 with the District Council of Kingscote to create the Kangaroo Island Council.

Natural geography

Geomorphology and geology
The Dudley Peninsula came into existence about 9,500 years BP when Kangaroo Island became separate from what is now Fleurieu Peninsula due to the rise in sea level following the end of the last ice age.
The peninsula has a geological basement of Tapanappa Formation sandstones (from the Kanmantoo Group) which were laid during the early  Cambrian period.  The basement stratum has undergone extensive erosion to create laterite based soil which covers the northern half of the peninsula.  The southern half of the peninsula has a Bridgewater Group limestone which was laid over the basement stratum during the Pleistocene and which has eroded to form a dune field.

Climate

Human geography

Settlements
Settlements on the Dudley Peninsula consist of Penneshaw which overlooks Backstairs Passage on the north coast with the following being located on the north west coast overlooking Nepean Bay (from east to west) – Baudin Beach, Island Beach and Sapphiretown.

Demographics
At the 2011 census, the Dudley Peninsula had a population of 595 with 276 persons located in Penneshaw and the remaining 319 located on the remainder of the peninsula, being the localities of American Beach, Antechamber Bay, Baudin Beach, Brown Beach, Cuttlefish Bay, Dudley East, Dudley West, Ironstone, Island Beach, Kangaroo Head, Pelican Lagoon, Porky Flat, Sapphiretown, Willoughby and Willson River.

Land use
As of 1989, most of the northern side of the peninsula above a line from Cape Willoughby in the east to Strawbridge Point at the junction of American River and Eastern Cove in the west had been progressively cleared for agricultural purposes, while the southern side had retained most of its native vegetation.  Subsequent clearing of native vegetation on a broadacre scale ceased in 1990 with the proclamation of the Native Vegetation Act 1990. As of 2014, majority of the land on the Dudley Peninsula has been zoned by law for agricultural use (i.e. "primary production") followed by conservation including most of the coastal perimeter with exception to some parts of the Nepean Bay coastline and by residential use.

Transport

Roads
The peninsula is served by a road network extending from both Penneshaw on its northern coast and from Hog Bay Road, a road maintained by the South Australian Government.  Hog Bay Road which follows the peninsula's north-western coastline connects Penneshaw and the settlements overlooking Nepean Bay with the town of Kingscote and the rest of Kangaroo Island.

Sea
As of 2014, port infrastructure at Penneshaw was being used by Kangaroo Island SeaLink who operates the ferry service between Penneshaw and Cape Jervis on the South Australian mainland. Navigation aids located on the peninsula's coast include lighthouses at both Cape St Albans and Cape Willoughby.

Aviation
As of 2014, no public airfields were located within the extent of the Dudley Peninsula with the nearest and the only one available being the Kingscote Airport on the western part of the island in the locality of Cygnet River.

Governance
The Dudley Peninsula is located within the jurisdiction of the Kangaroo Island Council and within the following electorates – the state district of Finniss and the federal division of Mayo.

Protected areas
As of 2015, the Dudley Peninsula contained the following conservation parks – Baudin, Cape Willoughby, Dudley, Lashmar, Lesueur, Pelican Lagoon and Simpson.  Also, as of 2015, an area of privately owned land appropriately equivalent to that of the above conservation parks has protected status due to being subject to native vegetation heritage agreements.

See also
Dudley (disambiguation)

Citations and references

Citations

References
  

	

 
D